Sadala is a village in Rapla Parish, Rapla County, Estonia. It has an area of 385 hectares and a population of 10 (as of 1 February 2010). Between 1991–2017 (until the administrative reform of Estonian municipalities) the village was located in Juuru Parish.

Sadala village was detached from Lõiuse and Järlepa villages in 2010.

References

Villages in Rapla County